The National Citizens' Movement for Free Elections or NAMFREL is an election watchdog in the Philippines. It was the first and one of the most famous election watch campaigns. It is known to have introduced non-partisan national election monitoring to the Philippines after exposing the issues involved with the 1986 Snap Elections.

NAMFREL was co-founded by Jose S. Concepcion, Jr., and was its first National Chairperson. NAMFREL was formally organized in October 1983 as an offshoot of the New Voters Registration Committee, which was formed in the 1960s. It currently has the support of more than 140 benefactors and 125 organizations. Its current national chairperson is Augusto C. Lagman.
NAMFREL's goal is to ensure "free, orderly and honest elections" in the Philippines. It is a non-partisan organization with over 250,000 member-volunteers from different religious, civic, business, professional, labor, youth, educational, and non-government organizations.

The Commission on Elections (Comelec) has accredited NAMFREL as its "citizens' arm" since 1986 to conduct manual parallel counts, which it called "Operation Quick Count". In 1986, NAMFREL mobilized 500,000 volunteers nationwide to guard the snap presidential elections. President then dictator Ferdinand Marcos declared himself the winner of the election; the NAMFREL count, however, showed that Corazon Aquino won. In the days that followed, the EDSA People Power revolt took place, sweeping Aquino to power.

For the May 2010 automated Philippine presidential elections NAMFREL was not accredited to conduct its own count. Instead, the organization conducted a nationwide election observation mission called "Bantay ng Bayan" ("sentinels of the people").

Presently, NAMFREL is also active internationally, its officers and volunteers having worked as trainers, observer team members, election administrators and resource persons in 35 countries, and have sent its volunteers as the official Philippine observer delegation to Cambodia during the 1998 parliamentary elections there, as well as in Indonesia in 1999 for the Presidential elections after the fall of Suharto.

In 1998, NAMFREL representatives attended the International IDEA conference in Copenhagen.

See also
 Philippine electoral crisis, 2005

References

External links
 Official NAMFREL Website
 PCIJ profile of Jose S. Concepcion, Jr.

Elections in the Philippines
Corruption in the Philippines
Election and voting-related organizations
Non-profit organizations based in the Philippines
Organizations established in 1983